An election to Lincolnshire County Council took place on 2 May 2013 as part of the 2013 United Kingdom local elections. 77 electoral divisions returned one county councillor each by first-past-the-post voting for a four-year term of office. The electoral divisions were the same as those used at the previous election in 2009. No elections were held in North Lincolnshire or North East Lincolnshire, which are unitary authorities outside the area covered by the County Council.

All locally registered electors (British, Irish, Commonwealth and European Union citizens) who were aged 18 or over on Thursday 2 May 2013 were entitled to vote in the local elections. Those who were temporarily away from their ordinary address (for example, away working, on holiday, in student accommodation or in hospital) were also entitled to vote in the local elections, although those who had moved abroad and registered as overseas electors cannot vote in the local elections. It is possible to register to vote at more than one address (such as a university student who had a term-time address and lives at home during holidays) at the discretion of the local Electoral Register Office, but it remains an offence to vote more than once in the same local government election.

Summary
The election saw the Conservative Party lose overall control of the council. The party previously enjoyed a sizable majority, holding around three quarters of the seats. After the election, the Conservatives found themselves 6 seats short of an overall majority; the UK Independence Party was the council's second biggest party, with 16 seats. Since the election the Conservative group have negotiated a coalition deal with the Liberal Democrats, whereby there is one Liberal Democrat cabinet member. UKIP replaced the Liberal Democrats as the council's official opposition.

UKIP lost six of its councillors to defections shortly after the election, and as a result Labour now form the official opposition.

Results

|}

Results by electoral division

Boston

Boston Coastal

Boston East

Boston Fishtoft

Boston North West

Boston Rural

Boston South

Boston West

East Lindsey

Alford and Sutton

Horncastle and Tetford

Ingoldmells Rural

Louth Marsh

Louth North

Louth Rural North

Louth South

Louth Wolds

Mablethorpe

Skegness North

Skegness South

West Lindsey

Lincoln

North Kesteven

South Kesteven

South Holland

References

2013
2013 English local elections
2010s in Lincolnshire